Henry Dagmil (born 7 December 1981) is a Filipino long jumper. His personal best jump is 7.99 metres, achieved on June 7, 2008 in Los Angeles. He is a multi-titled long jumper as well as short-distance runner, having to compete in the Men's 4 × 100 m as well. He currently holds the Southeast Asian Games Record at the Men's Long Jump at 7.87 m he set at the 2007 edition in Nakhon Ratchasima in Thailand.

He has represented the Philippines locally and internationally from Philippine National Games, Regional Meets such as the Southeast Asian Games where he already earned three gold medals and the Asian Games where he finished fifth at the 2006 Asian Games. He also competed at the 2008 Olympic Games without reaching the final and the 2009 and 2011 World Championships in Athletics.

Competition record

References

1981 births
Living people
Sportspeople from South Cotabato
Filipino male sprinters
Filipino male long jumpers
Athletes (track and field) at the 2008 Summer Olympics
Olympic track and field athletes of the Philippines
Athletes (track and field) at the 2006 Asian Games
Athletes (track and field) at the 2010 Asian Games
Athletes (track and field) at the 2014 Asian Games
National Collegiate Athletic Association (Philippines) players
World Athletics Championships athletes for the Philippines
Asian Games competitors for the Philippines
Southeast Asian Games medalists in athletics
Mapúa University alumni
Southeast Asian Games gold medalists for the Philippines
Southeast Asian Games competitors for the Philippines
Southeast Asian Games silver medalists for the Philippines
Southeast Asian Games bronze medalists for the Philippines
Competitors at the 2005 Southeast Asian Games
Competitors at the 2007 Southeast Asian Games
Competitors at the 2009 Southeast Asian Games
Competitors at the 2011 Southeast Asian Games
Competitors at the 2013 Southeast Asian Games